Orle may refer to:

Places
 Orle, Grudziądz County, a village in Kuyavian-Pomeranian Voivodeship, north-central Poland
 Orle, Nakło County, a village in Kuyavian-Pomeranian Voivodeship, north-central Poland
 Orle, Radziejów County, a village in Kuyavian-Pomeranian Voivodeship, north-central Poland
 Orle, Wejherowo County, a village in Pomeranian Voivodeship, north Poland
 Orle, Kościerzyna County, a village in Pomeranian Voivodeship, north Poland
 Orle, West Pomeranian Voivodeship, a village in north-west Poland
 Orle, Croatia, a village in Zagreb County, Croatia
 Orle, Škofljica, a settlement in the Municipality of Škofljica, Slovenia
 Dolnje Orle, a village in the Municipality of Sevnica, Slovenia
 Gornje Orle, a village in the Municipality of Sevnica, Slovenia
 Orlé, a village in Asturias, Spain

Other
 Orle (helmet decoration), a decorative chaplet worn on bascinet helmets in the 15th century
 Orle (heraldry), a bordure detached from the edge of the shield
 Orle (film), a 1927 silent Polish film